Finningia is an old Latin name for Finland, along with Fennia, Finnia and most often used Finlandia. The name first appears in the work of Olaus Magnus from 1539, who placed Finningia olim regnum on the Scandinavian map to indicate the unhistorical past kingdom of Finland. The name presumably is a misconception of Pliny the Elder's Aeningia that probably did not mean Finland but the area of the present-day Baltic States. Aeningia seems to have first been confused with Finland by Jacob Ziegler in 1532.

References

Baltic Sea
Geographic history of Finland
Latin words and phrases